The Homoeocerini are a tribe of leaf-footed bugs, in the subfamily Coreinae erected by Amyot and Serville in 1843.  Genera are distributed from Africa to South-East Asia.

Genera 
The Coreoidea Species File lists:
 Aschistocoris Bergroth, 1909
 Ceratopachys Westwood, 1842
 Diocles (bug) Stål, 1866
 Fracastorius Distant, 1902
 Homoeocerus Burmeister, 1835
 Omanocoris Kiritshenko, 1916
 Ornytus (bug) Dallas, 1852
 Prismatocerus Amyot & Serville, 1843
 Uranocoris Walker, 1871

References

External links
 
 

Hemiptera tribes
Coreinae